Sillosuchus is a genus of shuvosaurid poposauroid archosaur that lived in South America during the Late Triassic period. Shuvosaurids were an unusual family of reptiles belonging to the group Poposauroidea; although their closest modern relatives are crocodilians, they were bipedal and lightly armored, with dinosaur-like hip and skull structures. Based on skull remains from members of the family such as Effigia, they were also toothless and likely beaked herbivores.

Discovery and naming
The holotype specimen of Sillosuchus, PVSJ 85, is a partial skeleton discovered in sediments of the Ischigualasto Formation, Cancha de Bochas Member in the Ischigualasto-Villa Unión Basin in northwestern Argentina. The skeleton includes various vertebrae, ribs, and pelvic (hip) bones. A shoulder girdle, humerus (upper arm bone), and partial tibiae (inner shin bones) were also associated with the skeleton but not featured in the original description of the specimen.

The generic name refers to Dr. William Sill, and suchus, from the Greek word meaning "crocodile". The specific name, longicervix, refers to the elongated cervical vertebrae of the genus. Later studies have shown that, while the neck of Sillosuchus was long compared to most pseudosuchians, this trait was par for the course for shuvosaurids. A reconstruction of the fossil was presented in 2008 by the National University of San Juan in Argentina, in an homage to Dr. William Dudley Sill who was an important promoter of paleontology in San Juan. Sillosuchus is the only named genus of bipedal poposauroid currently known from outside North America. Other bipedal poposauroids included the related shuvosaurids Shuvosaurus and Effigia, as well as the carnivorous Poposaurus.

Description 

However, other remains could possibly indicate that it could grow much larger. Most notable among additional remains was the possible specimen, PVL 2472, an isolated cervical (neck vertebra) initially misidentified as belonging to the giant quadrupedal predator Saurosuchus, a distant relative of Sillosuchus. This would indicate that Sillosuchus was among the largest terrestrial pseudosuchians (crocodilian-line archosaurs) if PVL 2472 is a specimen of Sillosuchus.

Sillosuchus had several unique features compared to its relatives. The neck and back vertebrae had large excavations or pockets on the side, an unusual trait that assisted paleontologists in assigning the giant cervical vertebra to Sillosuchus rather than Saurosuchus. The left and right ischia (rear-pointing hip bones) were short and fused to each other. They were also flattened in a dorsoventral (top-to-bottom) direction, unlike the case in most other reptiles in which they were flattened in a mediolateral (side-to-side) direction. Otherwise, the hip is practically identical to that of Effigia and Shuvosaurus (also sometimes known as "Chatterjeea").

References 

Poposauroids
Carnian genera
Late Triassic reptiles of South America
Triassic Argentina
Fossils of Argentina
Ischigualasto Formation
Fossil taxa described in 1997
Prehistoric pseudosuchian genera